Scopula pyraliata is a moth of the  family Geometridae. It is found in the Democratic Republic of Congo, Equatorial Guinea (Bioko), Gabon, Ivory Coast, Liberia, Nigeria and Uganda.

References

Moths described in 1898
pyraliata
Moths of Africa
Fauna of Bioko